Vilja Nyholm-Palm (since 2004 Palm; born 12 May 1957) is an Estonian theatre and film director.

She was born in Tallinn.

Since 1975 she worked at Estonian Television. 1994-2005 she taught at Tallinn University. 1999-2001 she was the program director of Kanal 2.

Filmography

 1995 "Wikmani poisid" (director)
 1998 "Isa" (television feature film; producer)
 1999 "Armuke" (television feature film; producer) 	
 2003 "Kodu keset linna" (director)

References

Living people
1957 births
Estonian women film directors
Academic staff of Tallinn University
People from Tallinn